"S.D.S." (Somebody Do Something) is a song by American hip hop recording artist Mac Miller. It was released on April 23, 2013, as the first single from his second studio album Watching Movies with the Sound Off (2013). The song was produced by Flying Lotus.

Background
On March 9, 2013 Mac Miller announced that the first single from Watching Movies with the Sound Off would be "S.D.S.". He premiered a snippet of the song on the second episode of his reality show Mac Miller and the Most Dope Family.

Music video
The music video premiered on MTV Jams on April 25, 2013. The music video features a guest appearance from actor Corey Feldman.

Track listing
 Digital single

Chart performance

Release history

References

2012 songs
2013 singles
Mac Miller songs
Rostrum Records singles
Songs written by Mac Miller